Al Majjatia Oulad Taleb is a small town and rural commune in Médiouna Province of the Casablanca-Settat region of Morocco. At the time of the 2004 census, the commune had a total population of 23322 people living in 4711 households.

References

Populated places in Médiouna Province
Rural communes of Casablanca-Settat